Grossbeckia is a genus of moths in the family Geometridae. The genus was erected by William Barnes and James Halliday McDunnough in 1912.

Species
Grossbeckia gymnopomparia Dyar, 1913
Grossbeckia semimaculata Barnes & McDunnough, 1912
Grossbeckia ochriplaga Warren, 1905

References

Geometridae
Taxa named by William Barnes (entomologist)
Taxa named by James Halliday McDunnough